61st meridian may refer to:

61st meridian east, a line of longitude east of the Greenwich Meridian
61st meridian west, a line of longitude west of the Greenwich Meridian